Homewood is a former railway station in Homewood, Victoria, Australia. There is no longer a station building at the site, and the tracks have been removed.

References

External links
Victorian Railway Stations - Homewood

Railway stations in Australia opened in 1883
Railway stations closed in 1978
Mansfield railway line
Disused railway stations in Victoria (Australia)